The 2017–18 season was the club's fifth season in the Scottish Premiership and their ninth consecutive season in the top flight of Scottish football. St Johnstone also competed in the Scottish Cup, the League Cup, and after a years absence they competed in qualifying for the Europa League. They were knocked out by FK Trakai in the First qualifying round and finished Eighth place in the League. This was the final season at the club for legends Alan Mannus, Steven MacLean, and Chris Millar, with the latter being rewarded with a testimonial.

Results & fixtures

Pre-season

Scottish Premiership

UEFA Europa League

Qualifying phase

Scottish League Cup

Scottish Cup

Squad statistics

Appearances

|-
|colspan="10"|Players who left the club during the 2017–18 season
|-

|}

Team statistics

League table

See also
List of St Johnstone F.C. seasons

Footnotes

References

St Johnstone F.C. seasons
St Johnstone